Lefkonas (before 1926: Πόπλη - Popli) is a village in the Florina Regional Unit in West Macedonia, Greece.

Name
Macedonian speaking locals of Prespa call this village Попли, Popli. The forms of the toponym rendered with о, а and ъ indicate they emerged from a *o sound and would have originally been either Poplje or Pop'li from the Slavic *pop- pupak meaning navel, centre. Pianka Włodzimierz writes that Poplje would be unlikely as the retention of l in this instance would not occur per the sound change norms of the Macedonian language. Włodzimierz instead states that the toponym might have originally been *Po̧pъlje. The toponym ending would have been replaced with a Turkish suffix lu, due to the importance of the village as a centre for Ottoman administration. In Albanian, the village is called Pëpli.

History
In the late 19th century, the village was the Ottoman administrative centre and seat of the müdir (district administrator) in the Lower Prespa area. Following the Greek-Turkish population exchange, the village mosque was demolished and the church of Michael the Archangel was built in its place. The village in the modern period is renowned for its landscaped gardens.

Demographics 
In the 1860s, Popli had 50 Christian houses. In the early 1900s, 180 Slavonic speaking Christians and 210 Muslim Albanians lived in the village. The Greek census (1920) recorded 492 people in the village and in 1923 there were 270 inhabitants (or 40 families) who were Muslim. The Albanian village population was present until 1926 when they went to Turkey and were replaced with prosfiges (Greek refugees), due to the Greek-Turkish population exchange. In 1926 within Popli there were 41 refugee families from Asia Minor. The Greek census (1928) recorded 310 village inhabitants. There were 41 refugee families (129 people) in 1928. After the Greek Civil War, the Macedonian speaking population became a minority in the village.

Lefkonas had 127 inhabitants in 1981. In fieldwork done by Riki Van Boeschoten in late 1993, Lefkonas was populated by a Greek population descended from Anatolian Greek refugees who arrived during the Greek-Turkish population exchange, and Slavophones.

References

External links
Prespes website

Populated places in Florina (regional unit)